Shah Zeynali (also Romanized as Shāh Zeyn‘alī; also known as Emāmzādeh Shāh Zeyn‘alī, Shāhzādeh Zeyn‘alī, and Tang-e Sādāt) is a village in Kuh Mareh Khami Rural District, in the Central District of Basht County, Kohgiluyeh and Boyer-Ahmad Province, Iran. At the 2006 census, its population was 222, in 46 families.

References 

Populated places in Basht County